Anaxyelidae is a family of incense cedar wood wasps in the order Hymenoptera. It contains only one living genus, Syntexis, which has only a single species, native to Western North America. Fossils of the family extend back to the Middle Jurassic, belonging to over a dozen extinct genera, with a particularly high diversity during the Early Cretaceous. Syntexis lay eggs in the sapwood of conifers, preferring recently burnt wood.

Genera
These genera belong to the family Anaxyelidae:

Taxonomy after
 Subfamily Syntexinae:
 Syntexis Rohwer, 1915 Western North America, Recent
 † Cretosyntexis Rasnitsyn & Martinez-Delclos, 2000 La Pedrera de Rubies Formation, Spain, Early Cretaceous (Barremian)
 † Curiosyntexis Kopylov, 2019 Ola Formation Russia, Late Cretaceous (Campanian)
 † Daosyntexis Kopylov, Rasnitsyn, Zhang & Zhang, 2020 Daohugou, China, Middle Jurassic (Callovian)
 † Dolichosyntexis Kopylov, 2019 Zaza Formation, Russia, Early Cretaceous (Aptian)
 † Eosyntexis Rasnitsyn, 1990 Purbeck Group, United Kingdom, Early Cretaceous (Berriasian) La Pedrera de Rubies Formation, Spain, Early Cretaceous (Barremian), Turga Formation, Russia, Aptian, Spanish amber, Early Cretaceous (Albian)
 † Orthosyntexis J. Gao, Engel, Shih, & T. Gao, 2021 Burmese amber, Myanmar, Late Cretaceous (Cenomanian)
 † Parasyntexis Kopylov, 2019 Khasurty, Zaza Formation, Russia, Early Cretaceous (Aptian)
 † Sclerosyntexis Wang, Ren, Kopylov & Gao, 2020 Burmese amber, Myanmar, Late Cretaceous (Cenomanian)
Anaxyelinae
 † Anasyntexis Rasnitsyn, 1968 Karabastau Formation, Middle/Late Jurassic (Callovian-Oxfordian)
 † Anaxyela Martynov, 1925 Karabastau Formation, Middle/Late Jurassic (Callovian-Oxfordian)
† Brachysyntexis Rasnitsyn, 1969 Daohugou, China, Middle Jurassic (Callovian), Karabastau Formation, Middle/Late Jurassic (Callovian-Oxfordian), Yixian Formation, China, Aptian, Khasurty, Zaza Formation, Russia, Early Cretaceous (Aptian)
 † Dolichostigma Rasnitsyn, 1968 Zaza Formation, Russia, Early Cretaceous (Aptian)
 † Kempendaja Rasnitsyn, 1968 Khaya Formation, Russia, Late Jurassic (Tithonian)
 † Kulbastavia Rasnitsyn, 1968 Karabastau Formation, Middle/Late Jurassic (Callovian-Oxfordian)
 † Mangus Kopylov, 2019 Dzun-Bain Formation, Mongolia, Early Cretaceous (Aptian)
 † Sphenosyntexis Rasnitzyn, 1969 Karabastau Formation, Middle/Late Jurassic (Callovian-Oxfordian)
 † Syntexyela Rasnitsyn, 1968 Karabastau Formation, Middle/Late Jurassic (Callovian-Oxfordian), Yixian Formation, China, Aptian
 † Urosyntexis Rasnitzyn, 1969 Karabastau Formation, Middle/Late Jurassic (Callovian-Oxfordian), Khasurty, Zaza Formation, Russia, Early Cretaceous (Aptian)

References

Further reading

 
 

Sawflies
Extant Jurassic first appearances